John Daniel Mahoney (September 7, 1931 – October 23, 1996) was a United States circuit judge of the United States Court of Appeals for the Second Circuit.

Education and career

Born in Orange, New Jersey, Mahoney received a Bachelor of Arts degree, magna cum laude, from St. Bonaventure University in 1952. He received a Bachelor of Laws from Columbia Law School in 1955 as a Kent Scholar. He was in the United States Coast Guard from 1955 to 1958. He was in private practice of law in New York City from 1958 to 1962 and from 1965 to 1986. He was the State Chairman of the New York Conservative Party from 1962 to 1986.

In 1985, Mahoney represented the National Review and its editor, William F. Buckley Jr., during the magazine's $16 million libel suit against The Spotlight.

Conservative Party of New York

Mahoney founded the Conservative Party of New York, with his brother-in-law, Kieran O'Doherty, who served as the new party's first chairman. The Conservative Party was established as a counterweight to the Liberal Party of New York, which endorsed Democrats on the political left. Mahoney authored Actions Speak Louder: The Story of the New York Conservative Party (Arlington House, 1968), which recounts the formation and early years of the party.

Further information regarding  Mahoney and the formation of the Conservative Party and its role in the conservative movement through 2002 is available in Fighting the Good Fight, authored by George J. Marlin (St. Augustine's Press, 2002). Marlin was the Conservative Party mayoral nominee in 1993, having been defeated by the then-liberal Republican Rudy Giuliani.

Federal judicial service

Mahoney was nominated by President Ronald Reagan on February 7, 1986, to the United States Court of Appeals for the Second Circuit, to a new seat created by 98 Stat. 333. He was confirmed by the United States Senate on March 27, 1986, and received commission on April 7, 1986. His service was terminated on October 23, 1996, due to death.

Death

Mahoney died of a cerebral hemorrhage on October 23, 1996, in Derby, Connecticut.

References

Sources

External links

 As J. Daniel Mahoney
 As Daniel Mahoney

St. Bonaventure University alumni
1931 births
1996 deaths
Columbia Law School alumni
Judges of the United States Court of Appeals for the Second Circuit
United States court of appeals judges appointed by Ronald Reagan
20th-century American judges
Conservative Party of New York State politicians
American political party founders